The BLH AS-16 was a diesel-electric locomotive rated at , that rode on two-axle trucks, having a B-B wheel arrangement.  It was the successor to Baldwin's DRS-4-4-1500 model, and remained in production until Baldwin-Lima-Hamilton quit the locomotive manufacturing business in 1956.

Nine railroads bought 127 locomotives, with five railroads having bought the previous model. None have survived into preservation.

Original buyers

Usage
The AS-16 was designed as an all-around useful locomotive, capable of freight or passenger service.
The engine had optional benefits such as a steam generator or dynamic brakes. 
The AAR Type B truck warranted higher speed than its siblings, the AS-416 and  AS-616, with their three axle trucks.

References 

 

B-B locomotives
AS-16
Diesel-electric locomotives of the United States
Railway locomotives introduced in 1950
Standard gauge locomotives of the United States